Christopher Adam Vincent (born September 3, 1981 in Philadelphia) is a former American football running back. 

Vincent attended Neshaminy High School in Langhorne, Pennsylvania and was enrolled at Valley Forge Military Academy for a Prep year. He signed with Louisiana State University and signed a letter of intent in February before transferring to the University of Oregon later in the year. He was signed by the Detroit Lions as an undrafted free agent in 2007. Vincent was also a member of the Arizona Cardinals.

External links
Arizona Cardinals bio
Oregon Ducks bio

1981 births
Living people
Sportspeople from Philadelphia
Players of American football from Pennsylvania
American football running backs
Oregon Ducks football players
Detroit Lions players
Arizona Cardinals players
Valley Forge Military Academy Trojans football players